Dichomeris exallacta is a moth in the family Gelechiidae. It was described by Edward Meyrick in 1926. It is found in Peru.

The forewings are light grey, suffusedly irrorated (sprinkled) with whitish towards the costa and dorsum from about one-third onwards. The stigmata is cloudy, obscurely and indistinctly darker, the plical rather obliquely before first the discal. There is an obtusely angulated obscure whitish transverse shade at four-fifths, the terminal area beyond this suffusedly irrorated with whitish. There are also indistinct dark grey marginal dots on the apical part of the costa and termen. The hindwings are light grey.

References

Moths described in 1926
exallacta